Massilia plicata is a Gram-negative, rod-shaped, non-spore-forming, motile bacterium  from the genus Massilia and family Oxalobacteraceae, which was isolated with Massilia dura, Massilia albidiflava, and Massilia lutea from soils in China. Colonies of M. plicata are yellow to pale brown.

References

External links
Type strain of Massilia plicata at BacDive -  the Bacterial Diversity Metadatabase

Burkholderiales
Bacteria described in 2006